Mary Pelloni is an American television producer, director and executive producer, based in Los Angeles, California.  She is currently the executive producer of TLC's DC Cupcakes, Niecy Nash's Wedding Bash and Undercover Princes.

Pelloni started her career at 19 years old at WXYZ-TV in Detroit, Michigan.  Pelloni produced several talk shows including The Fran Drescher Show on Fox TV and most notably The Roseanne Talk show where she made several television appearances as herself as well as comedy sketches as Monica Lewinsky.  She was the executive producer of Bridezillas and  Secret Princes.

In 2014 Pelloni was hired to produce specials and series for Discovery Studios.

References

External links
Mary Pelloni appearances on the Roseanne talk show

Year of birth missing (living people)
Living people